Sound into Blood into Wine is the soundtrack for the film Blood into Wine, starring Maynard James Keenan and Eric Glomski.

Track listing

2010 soundtrack albums
Puscifer soundtracks
Puscifer remix albums
2010 remix albums
Self-released albums
Documentary film soundtracks